A Christmas Story is a 1983 Christmas comedy film directed by Bob Clark and based on Jean Shepherd's semi-fictional anecdotes in his 1966 book In God We Trust: All Others Pay Cash, with some elements from his 1971 book Wanda Hickey's Night of Golden Memories And Other Disasters. It stars Melinda Dillon, Darren McGavin, and Peter Billingsley. Widely considered a holiday classic in the United States and Canada, it has been shown in a marathon annually on TNT since 1997 and on TBS since 2004 titled "24 Hours of A Christmas Story", consisting of 12 consecutive airings of the film from the evening of Christmas Eve to the evening of Christmas Day annually. It is the third installment in the Parker Family Saga.

The film was released on November 18, 1983, and received positive reviews from critics. Filmed partly in Canada, it earned two Canadian Genie Awards in 1984. In 2012, it was selected for preservation in the United States National Film Registry by the Library of Congress for being "culturally, historically, or aesthetically significant".

Plot

Set in December 1940, the film is presented in a series of vignettes, with narration provided by the adult Ralphie Parker reminiscing on one particular Christmas when he was nine years old in the fictional town of Hohman, Indiana. Ralphie wanted only one thing that Christmas: a Red Ryder Carbine Action 200-shot Range Model air rifle. Ralphie's desire is rejected by his mother, his teacher Miss Shields, and even a Santa Claus at Higbee's department store, all giving him the same warning: "You'll shoot your eye out".

On Christmas morning, Ralphie receives some presents that he enjoys but is disappointed not to find the rifle among them. When it appears that all of the presents have been opened, Ralphie's father ("The Old Man") directs him to one last box hidden in the corner, which proves to contain the rifle. He eagerly hurries outside to try it out, attaching a target to a metal sign in the backyard; when he fires, the BB ricochets back and hits him in the face. Believing at first that he has indeed shot his eye out, he realizes that the BB only knocked his glasses off and begins searching for them in the snow, only to step on them by accident and break them. He lies to his mother that a falling icicle struck him in the face and broke his glasses, and she believes him and takes him to the bathroom to get cleaned up.

That night, Ralphie goes to sleep with the gun by his side as his adult self reflects that it was the best Christmas present he had ever received or would ever receive.

Other vignettes
Interspersed with the main story are several loosely related vignettes involving the Parkers:

 The Old Man wins a "major award" in a contest – a table lamp in the shape of a woman's leg wearing a fishnet stocking. The Old Man is overjoyed but Mrs. Parker is not. "The Battle of the Lamp" develops, ending with Mrs. Parker "accidentally" destroying it, much to the Old Man's fury. Unable to fix the lamp, he defeatedly buries the remains in the backyard.
 The Old Man also fights a never-ending battle with the malfunctioning furnace in the Parker home. His frustrations cause him to swear quite often, including one profanity-laden rant (heard as gibberish) that the adult Ralphie says "is still hanging in space over Lake Michigan". His influence later reflects back upon Ralphie when The Old Man's car suddenly blows a tire, and Mrs. Parker suggests that Ralphie help his father change the tire. While holding the lug nuts in the tire's hubcap, The Old Man accidentally knocks them out of Ralphie's hands, causing Ralphie to utter profanity and have his mouth washed out with Lifebuoy soap.
 Still another source of frustration for The Old Man is the dogs that belong to the Bumpus family, the Parkers' hillbilly next-door neighbors. The Bumpuses own "at least 785 smelly hound dogs" that harass The Old Man whenever he comes home from work. On Christmas Day, the dogs ruin the family's dinner by romping through their kitchen and eating their turkey, forcing the family to go to a Chinese restaurant for Christmas dinner.
 Ralphie and his friends Flick and Schwartz along with Randy are tormented by the neighborhood bullies Scut Farkus and Grover Dill. Ralphie eventually snaps and beats up Farkus. Mrs. Parker catches him mid-fight and Ralphie expects her to tell The Old Man, but instead she redirects the conversation to a football game, leading The Old Man to brush it off.

Cast
 Peter Billingsley as Ralphie Parker
 Jean Shepherd as adult Ralphie (voice) / man standing in the Santa Claus line at Higbee's
 Ian Petrella as Randy Parker
 Melinda Dillon as Mrs. Parker
 Darren McGavin as Mr. Parker (The Old Man)
 Scott Schwartz as Flick
 R. D. Robb as Schwartz
 Zack Ward as Scut Farkus
 Yano Anaya as Grover Dill
 Tedde Moore as Miss Shields
 Jeff Gillen as Santa Claus
 Patty Johnson as Lead Elf
 Drew Hocevar as Male Elf
 Leslie Carlson as Christmas Tree Salesman

Casting
The basis of the screenplay is a series of monologues written and performed by Jean Shepherd on the radio. Shepherd wrote the adaptation with Bob Clark and Leigh Brown. Several subplots are incorporated into the body of the film, based on other separate short stories by Shepherd. Shepherd provides the film's narration from the perspective of an adult Ralphie, a narrative style later used in the comedy-drama television series The Wonder Years. Shepherd, Brown, and Clark have cameo appearances in the film: Shepherd plays the man who directs Ralphie and Randy to the back of the Santa line at the department store; Brown – Shepherd's wife in real life – plays the woman in the Santa line with Shepherd; Clark plays Swede, the neighbor the Old Man talks to outside during the Leg Lamp scene.

In the DVD commentary, director Bob Clark mentions that Jack Nicholson was considered for the role of the Old Man; Clark expresses gratitude that he ended up with Darren McGavin instead, who later appeared in several other Clark films. He cast Melinda Dillon on the basis of her similar role in Close Encounters of the Third Kind. Some 8,000 actors auditioned for the role of Ralphie, among the 8,000 actors were Keith Coogan, Sean Astin and Wil Wheaton; "He walked in, and he had us from the beginning", Clark later recalled of Peter Billingsley who was already a successful actor in commercials and from co-hosting the TV series Real People. Clark initially wanted him for the role of Ralphie but decided he was "too obvious" a choice and auditioned many other young actors before realizing that Billingsley was the right choice after all.

Ian Petrella was cast immediately before filming began. Tedde Moore had previously appeared in Clark's film Murder by Decree and was the only onscreen character from A Christmas Story who was played by the same actor in the sequel, My Summer Story. Jeff Gillen was an old friend of Clark's who had been in one of his earliest films. The schoolyard bully, Scut Farkus, was played by Zack Ward, now an actor, writer and director, who had actually been bullied himself while in elementary school. In 2017, he said he was surprised at the impact his role had over the years: "I saw that I was ranked – as Christmas villains go – higher than the Grinch. That's amazing".

Production
The screenplay for A Christmas Story is based on material from author Jean Shepherd's collection of short stories, In God We Trust, All Others Pay Cash.  Three of the semi-autobiographical short stories on which the film is based were originally published in Playboy magazine between 1964 and 1966. Shepherd later read "Duel in the Snow, or Red Ryder nails the Cleveland Street Kid" and told the otherwise unpublished story "Flick's Tongue" on his WOR Radio talk show, as can be heard in one of the DVD extras. Bob Clark states on the DVD commentary that he became interested in Shepherd's work when he heard "Flick's Tongue" on the radio in 1968. Additional source material for the film, according to Clark, came from unpublished anecdotes that Shepherd told live audiences "on the college circuit". While shooting scenes in Cleveland in early 1983, Clark told a reporter that it had taken him a considerable number of years to get the film into production. Shepherd envisioned his stories as "Dickens’s Christmas Carol as retold by Scrooge", although Clark would soften it for the movie; the two did not particularly get along, as Clark did not admire Shepherd's attempts at trying to guide the actors with ideas about how the characters should be played, to the point where he had him barred from the set.

Locations

The film is set in Hohman, Indiana, a fictionalized version of Shepherd's hometown of Hammond, near Chicago. The name is derived from Hohman Avenue, a major street in downtown Hammond. Local references in the film include Warren G. Harding Elementary School and Cleveland Street (where Shepherd spent his childhood). Other local references include mention of a person "swallowing a yo-yo" in nearby Griffith, the Old Man being one of the fiercest "furnace fighters in Northern Indiana" and that his obscenities were "hanging in space over Lake Michigan", a mention of the Indianapolis 500, and the line to Santa Claus "stretching all the way to Terre Haute". The Old Man is also revealed to be a fan of the Bears (whom he jokingly calls the "Chicago Chipmunks") and White Sox, consistent with living in northwest Indiana. In commemoration of the setting, the City of Hammond holds an annual exhibit regarding the film in November and December, including a statue recreating the scene where Ralphie's friend Flick freezes his tongue to a flagpole.

Director Bob Clark reportedly sent scouts to twenty cities before selecting Cleveland for exterior filming. Cleveland was chosen because of Higbee's Department Store in downtown Cleveland. (Since Higbee's was exclusive to northeast Ohio, the department store referred to in Shepherd's book and the film is most likely Goldblatt's, located in downtown Hammond (with the Cam-Lan Chinese Restaurant three doors down on Sibley Ave). Until they connected with Higbee's, location scouts had been unsuccessful in finding a department store that was willing to be part of the film. Higbee's vice president Bruce Campbell agreed to take part in the project on the condition he is allowed to edit the script for cursing. Ultimately, Higbee's was the stage for three scenes in the film:
 The opening scene in which Ralphie first spies the Red Ryder BB Gun in the store's Christmas window display. Higbee's was known for its elaborate, child-centered Christmas themes and decorations, with Santa as the centerpiece.
 The parade scene, filmed just outside Higbee's on Public Square at 3 AM. The parade was filmed at night because during the daytime the 1960s Erieview Tower and Federal Building was visible from the Public Square, as was the BP Tower, which was under construction at the time.
 Ralphie and Randy's visit to see Santa, which was filmed inside Higbee's. The store kept the Santa slide that was made for the film and used it for several years after the film's release. Higbee's became Dillard's in 1992 and closed permanently in 2002.

In addition to the scenes involving Higbee's, the exterior shots (and select interior shots where Ralphie lived, including the opening of the leg lamp) of the house and neighborhood, were filmed in the Tremont section of Cleveland's West Side. The house used as the Parker home in these scenes has been restored, reconfigured inside to match the soundstage interiors, and opened to the public as "A Christmas Story House". Appropriately, the fictional boyhood home of Ralphie Parker is on Cleveland Street, the name of the actual street where Shepherd grew up.

Several other locations were used. The school scenes were shot at the Victoria School in St. Catharines, Ontario. The Christmas tree-purchasing scene was filmed in Toronto, Ontario, as was the sound stage filming of interior shots of the Parker home. The "...only I didn't say fudge" scene was filmed at the foot of Cherry Street in Toronto; several lake freighters are visible in the background spending the winter at Toronto's port, which lends authenticity to the time of year when the film was produced.

In 2008, two Canadian fans released a documentary that visits every location. Their film, Road Trip for Ralphie, was shot over two years and includes footage of the filmmakers saving Miss Shields' blackboard from the garbage bin on the day the old Victoria School was gutted for renovation, discovering the antique fire truck that saved Flick, locating original costumes from the film, and tracking down the location of the film's Chop Suey Palace in Toronto.

Red Ryder BB Gun

The "Red Ryder" model BB Gun was manufactured in Plymouth, Michigan by Daisy, beginning in 1940; it was never manufactured in the exact configuration mentioned in the film. The Daisy "Buck Jones" model did have a compass and a sundial in the stock, but these features were not included in the Red Ryder model. The compass and sundial were placed on Ralphie's BB gun, but on the opposite side of the stock due to Peter Billingsley being left-handed.

Dating the story
Director Bob Clark stated in the film's DVD commentary that both he and author Shepherd wished for the film to be seen as "amorphously late-'30s, early-'40s". A specific year is never explicitly mentioned in the film. The Look magazine that Ralphie hides the Red Ryder ad in, is the December 1937 cover with Shirley Temple and Santa. Ralphie's Little Orphan Annie Secret Society Decoder Pin bears the date 1940 (and is the real-life decoder pin released to society members that year, though by that time Ovaltine had ceased its sponsorship and Quaker was the primary sponsor of the series), the parade in front of Higbee's features characters from MGM's version of The Wizard of Oz, which was released in 1939, a 1939 calendar is seen in one scene, and World War II, which the United States entered in December 1941, is never mentioned. The "Old Man's" treasured Oldsmobile 6 is a 1937 Oldsmobile F-Series Touring Sedan. Despite the director and author both stating that the year has been obfuscated, numerous sources, including The New York Times and CBS News, have dated the film to 1940 or the early 1940s.

The real Shepherd was several years older than Ralphie; Shepherd was intentionally dishonest about many of the details of his own life and regularly obscured the line between fact and fiction in his writings. A teacher named "Miss Shields" was Shepherd's second-grade teacher at Warren G. Harding Elementary School in 1928. By 1939, Shepherd had already graduated from high school.

Release and reception
Initially overlooked as a sleeper film, A Christmas Story was released a week before Thanksgiving 1983 to moderate success, earning about $2 million in its first weekend. Film critic Roger Ebert initially gave the film three stars out of four, but later gave the film four stars and added the film to his "Great Movies" list and suggested the film had only modest success because holiday-themed films were not popular at the time. Vincent Canby's mostly negative The New York Times review complained that "the movie's big comic pieces tend only to be exceedingly busy. Though Mr Billingsley, Mr Gavin [sic], Miss Dillon and the actress who plays Ralphie's school teacher (Tedde Moore) are all very able, they are less funny than actors in a television situation comedy".

In Canada, the film would go on to win two categories in the 5th Genie Awards, for Director Bob Clark and Best Original Screenplay for the work of Leigh Brown, Bob Clark and Jean Shepherd.

By Christmas 1983, the film was no longer playing at most venues but remained in about a hundred theatres until January 1984. Gross earnings were just over $19.2 million. In the years since, due to television airings and home video release, A Christmas Story has become widely popular and is now an annual Christmas special. The film was produced and released by Metro-Goldwyn-Mayer (MGM). The rights to the film were acquired by Turner Entertainment Co. after Ted Turner's purchase of MGM's pre-1986 film library. Subsequently, Time Warner purchased Turner Entertainment in 1996, and currently holds rights to the film as Warner Bros. Discovery (WBD).

Over the years, the film's critical reputation has grown considerably and it is regarded by some as one of the best films of 1983. Based on 59 reviews on Rotten Tomatoes, the film has an overall approval rating from critics of 90%, with an average score of 8.60/10. The site's consensus reads: "Both warmly nostalgic and darkly humorous, A Christmas Story deserves its status as a holiday perennial". On Metacritic, the film has a score of 77 out of 100, based on 16 critics, indicating "generally favorable reviews". In his movie guide, Leonard Maltin awarded the film a four-star rating, calling the film "delightful" and "truly funny for kids and grown-ups alike" with "wonderful period flavor".

On December 24, 2007, AOL ranked the film their #1 Christmas film of all time. IGN ranked the film the top holiday-themed film of all time. In 2012, a Marist Poll named the film the favorite holiday film in the US. In 2019, a poll commissioned by Tubitv and conducted by Onepoll also ranked the film Best Holiday Movie Ever.

Lawsuit
In August 2011, Zack Ward, who played Scut Farkus in the film, sued Warner Bros. and Enesco over merchandising for the film after the company authorized a figure resembling his character from the film without his permission. It was revealed that when he signed on to play that character, he did not receive any merchandising rights because of a mishap with his contract. The lawsuit was dropped in January 2012 after Warner Bros. revealed that the figurine showed a "generic face" that has been used on them since 2006 and that statute of limitations had run out.

In December 2012, Ward sued Warner Bros. again over his image after attending the annual Christmas Story charity fundraiser convention in Cleveland in November 2010, where a fan handed him a Christmas Story board game, playing cards, and calendar showing his face. The lawsuit was settled three days later.

Broadcasting and home media release

Television
The film first aired on television on premium networks The Movie Channel, HBO, and Showtime as early as December 1985, and quickly attracted a growing following. In December 1987, the film premiered on SuperStation WTBS and local television stations. In 1989 and 1990, TBS showed it Thanksgiving night, while in 1991 and 1992, they aired it the night after.

24 Hours of A Christmas Story
Turner Broadcasting has maintained ownership of the broadcast rights, and since the mid-1990s, they have continued to air the film increasingly on both TBS & TNT all throughout the holiday season annually. TCM has also aired the film many times, as well. By 1995, it was aired on those networks a combined six times on December 24–26, and in 1996, it was aired eight times over four days, not including local airings.

Due to the increasing popularity of the film, in 1997, TNT began airing a 24-hour marathon dubbed "24 Hours of A Christmas Story", consisting of the film shown twelve consecutive times beginning at 8 p.m. on Christmas Eve and ending at 8 p.m. on Christmas Day. This was in addition to various other airings earlier in the month of December. In 2004, after TNT switched to a predominantly drama format, sister network TBS, under its comedy-based "Very Funny" moniker, took over the marathon. Clark stated that, in 2002, an estimated 38.4 million people tuned into the marathon at one point or another, nearly one sixth of the country. TBS reported 45.4 million viewers in 2005, and 45.5 million in 2006. In 2007, new all-time ratings records were set, with the highest single showing (8 p.m. Christmas Eve) drawing 4.4 million viewers. Viewership increased again in 2008, with 8 p.m. Christmas Eve drawing 4.5 million viewers, and 10 p.m. drawing 4.3 million, and 54.4 million total. As of 2009, the film had been shown 250 times on the Turner family of networks.

In 2007, the marathon continued, and the original tradition was revived. TNT also aired the film twice the Sunday of Thanksgiving weekend (November 25). In 2009, the 24-hour marathon continued on TBS, for the 13th overall year, starting at 8 p.m. eastern on Christmas Eve.

In 2009, the film aired on TBS during a 24-hour marathon on Christmas Eve. The first viewing at 8 p.m. Eastern on December 24 earned a 1.6 rating (18–49) and beat the major broadcast networks (NBC, ABC, CBS, and Fox). In 2010, the marathon averaged 3 million viewers, up 2% from the previous year, ranking TBS as the top cable network for the 24-hour period. The 10 a.m. airing on December 25 was seen by 4.4 million viewers, and the 8 p.m. airing on December 24 was close behind with 4.3 million viewers. The marathons in 2011 and 2012 continued to see increases in ratings.

Beginning with the 2014 edition of the marathon, Turner elected to simulcast it on both TNT and TBS, marking the first time since 2003 that TNT aired it as well as the first time the marathon was aired on multiple networks. The two networks staggered their airings one hour apart. The TBS marathon began at 8 p.m. (eastern), while the TNT marathon began at 9 p.m. (eastern). Both networks have run 24-hour marathons with the one-hour offset format from 2014 annually making it a new tradition for both TBS and TNT networks. For 2019, a majority of the most-watched programs—13 out of the top 25—broadcast on cable Christmas Day were A Christmas Story.

Subsequent screen adaptations and sequels

The PBS series American Playhouse produced two subsequent television film adaptations featuring the same characters, also with Shepherd narrating: The Star-Crossed Romance of Josephine Cosnowski and Ollie Hopnoodle's Haven of Bliss. The latter of these was set in the early 1950s with a now-teenaged Ralphie and his friends and family. Shepherd had previously created The Phantom of the Open Hearth and The Great American Fourth of July and Other Disasters for the same network.

A theatrical sequel involving Ralphie and his family, titled It Runs in the Family, was made in 1994. With the exceptions of Tedde Moore as Miss Shields (Ralphie's teacher) and Jean Shepherd as the narrator (the voice of the adult Ralphie), it features an entirely different cast. It received a limited release before being retitled My Summer Story for home video and television release.

A Christmas Story 2 is a direct sequel to the film,  which ignores the references and events of My Summer Story and was released direct-to-video in 2012 and directed by Brian Levant. It was filmed in New Westminster, British Columbia, Canada.

Another sequel to the film (which has no relation with A Christmas Story 2), entitled A Christmas Story Christmas, was released in 2022. The film is directed by The Christmas Chronicles director Clay Kaytis and written by The Mule writer Nick Schenk (who is also executive producer of the film). Peter Billingsley reprised the role from the original film, in addition serving as the film's producer. The film was released via streaming on HBO Max by Warner Bros. Discovery Global Streaming & Interactive Entertainment. It takes place in the 1970s following an adult Ralphie catching up with his old childhood friends. Ian Petrella, Scott Schwartz, R. D. Robb, and Zack Ward reprised their roles of Randy Parker, Flick, Schwartz, and Scut Farkus, respectively. Erinn Hayes, River Drosche, and Julianna Layne played Ralphie's wife and his kids while Julie Hagerty played Mrs. Parker in a role originated by Melinda Dillon (who would die less than two months after the film was released) in the original film. The film is dedicated to the memory of Darren McGavin (who played Ralphie's Old Man in the original film), who died on February 25, 2006, at the age of 83.

Stage adaptations
In 2000, a stage play adaptation of A Christmas Story was written by Philip Grecian.

In November 2012, A Christmas Story: The Musical, based on the film, opened on Broadway. Written by Benj Pasek and Justin Paul (music and lyrics) and Joseph Robinette (book), the musical opened to positive reviews. The run ended on December 30 the same year. The musical was directed by John Rando with choreography by Warren Carlyle and featured Dan Lauria as Jean Shepherd. The musical received Tony Award nominations for Best Musical, Best Book of a Musical (Robinette), and Best Original Score (Music or Lyrics) Written for the Theatre.

The musical was then adapted for television as the three hour A Christmas Story Live!, which aired on the Fox network in the United States on December 17, 2017. Reviews were mixed; on Rotten Tomatoes, the production received a 46% rating based on 13 critics' reviews.

Home media

 Betamax (1984, 1988)
 VHS (1984, 1988, 1993, 1994, 1999, 2000)
 LaserDisc (1985): Pan and scan
 LaserDisc (1993): Deluxe Letterbox Edition
 DVD (1997, reissued by Warner Home Video in 1999): fullscreen, includes the original theatrical trailer
 DVD (2003) 20th Anniversary 2-Disc Special Edition DVD (2003): Widescreen & Fullscreen; includes cast interviews, audio commentary, and featurettes.
 HD DVD (2006)
 Blu-ray (2006)
 DVD (2008) Ultimate Collector's Edition: Metal tin case features the same 2003 two-disc special edition, but includes special memorabilia.
 Blu-ray (2008) Ultimate Collector's Edition: Metal tin which features the same 2006 Blu-ray Disc, but also includes a strand of Leg Lamp Christmas lights.
 Blu-ray (2013) 30th Anniversary Edition: Steelbook with Blu-ray in 1080p (like the previous Blu-ray and HD-DVD) with a DTS-HD Master Audio mono track (whereas the previous releases had Dolby Digital mono), and more special features than the previous Blu-ray and HD-DVD.
 Ultra HD Blu-ray (2022)

See also
 List of Christmas films
 Parker Family Saga (franchise)

References

Sources

External links

 Official DVD site
 TBS.com's A Christmas Story website
 
 
 
 
 
 "The Man Who Told A Christmas Story: What I learned from Jean Shepherd" by Donald Fagen – Slate

1980s English-language films
1983 films
1983 comedy films
1980s Christmas films
Films based on works by Jean Shepherd
American Christmas comedy films
Canadian Christmas comedy films
English-language Canadian films
Films scored by Paul Zaza
Films about bullying
Films about families
Films based on American novels
Films based on multiple works
Films directed by Bob Clark
Films set in Indiana
Films set in the 1940s
Films shot in Cleveland
Films shot in Ohio
Films shot in Toronto
Metro-Goldwyn-Mayer films
United States National Film Registry films
Works by Jean Shepherd
American children's comedy films
1980s American films
1980s Canadian films